The 1968 United States presidential election in Maryland was held on November 5, 1968, as part of the 1968 United States presidential election. Maryland was won by Hubert Humphrey by a margin of 20,315 votes against Richard Nixon and by 359,576 votes against George Wallace.

Maryland was the home state of Republican vice presidential nominee Spiro Agnew, who was the sitting Governor of Maryland at the time of the election. Since Nixon lost his home state of New York, this, along with the 1916 election, is one of two times were the winning presidential and vice-presidential candidates lost both of their home states.

Nixon became the first Republican since James A. Garfield in 1880 to win the White House without carrying Calvert County.

Results

Results by county

Counties that flipped from Democratic to Republican
Allegany
Anne Arundel
Baltimore (County)
Caroline
Carroll
Cecil
Charles
Frederick
Harford
Howard
Kent
Prince George's
Queen Anne's
Somerset
St. Mary's
Talbot
Washington
Wicomico
Worcester

See also
 United States presidential elections in Maryland
 1968 United States presidential election
 1968 United States elections

Notes

References 

Maryland
1968
Presidential